WildCat (roller coaster) may refer to: 
 WildCat (Cedar Point), a roller coaster that operated 1979 to 2012 at Cedar Point in Sandusky, Ohio which was replaced by Luminosity — Ignite the Night!
 Wildcat, a roller coaster that operated 1970 to 1978 at Cedar Point in Sandusky, Ohio
 Wildcat (Frontier City), a wooden roller coaster at Frontier City in Oklahoma City, Oklahoma
 Wildcat (Lake Compounce), a wooden roller coaster at Lake Compounce in Bristol, Connecticut 
 Wildcat (Schwarzkopf), a model series of steel roller coasters designed and built by Anton Schwarzkopf
 Wildcat (Adventure Park USA), A Schwarzkopf coaster at Adventure Park USA in Monrovia, Maryland
 Wild Cat (Hersheypark), a wooden roller coaster that operated from 1923-1945 at Hersheypark in Hershey, Pennsylvania
 Wildcat’s Revenge, a hybrid roller coaster originally named Wildcat at Hersheypark in Hershey, Pennsylvania
 Wildcat, a wooden roller coaster that operated at the original Elitch Gardens in Denver, Colorado and closed in 1994.

Other uses
Ozark Wildcat (roller coaster), a wooden roller coaster that operated from 2003 to 2008 at Celebration City in Branson, Missouri
Wolverine Wildcat (Michigan's Adventure), a wooden roller coaster at Michigan's Adventure near Muskegon, Michigan